Christian Luschnig (born 25 December 1938) is a German wrestler. He competed in the men's freestyle featherweight at the 1960 Summer Olympics.

References

External links
 

1938 births
Living people
German male sport wrestlers
Olympic wrestlers of the United Team of Germany
Wrestlers at the 1960 Summer Olympics
Sportspeople from Jena